General Sundararajan Padmanabhan PVSM, AVSM, VSM (born 5 December 1940 in Thiruvananthapuram, Travancore) is a former General Officer of the Indian Army. He served as the 17th Chief of Army Staff of the Indian Army. Gen. Padmanabhan succeeded General V.P. Malik on 30 September 2000. He also served as Chairman of the Chiefs of Staff Committee.

Early life and education
Padmanabhan was born in a Tamil Brahmin family. He was schooled at the Rashtriya Indian Military College, Dehradun. In 1956, Padmanabhan joined the National Defence Academy and then the Indian Military Academy, from where graduated in 1959.

Military career
Padmanabhan was commissioned into the Regiment of Artillery on 13 December 1959.

He attended the Defence Services Staff College, Wellington in 1973. Post this, he commanded an Independent Light Battery from 1975 to 1976. He then commanded the Gazala Mountain Regiment from 1977 to 1980. He also served as Instructor Gunnery at the School of Artillery, Deolali and two terms as an instructor at the Indian Military Academy.

AS a Brigadier, he attended the prestigious National Defence College, New Delhi. 
He then commanded an Infantry Brigade from December 1988 to February 1991 at Ranchi, Bihar and Punjab and was then appointed as the General Officer Commanding an Infantry Division in Punjab from March 1991 to August 1992. He served as Chief of Staff, III Corps from September 1992 to June 1993. After his promotion to Lieutenant General, he took over as the General Officer Commanding XV Corps in the Kashmir valley from July 1993 to February 1995. It was during his tenure as the XV Corps Commander, that the Army made big gains over the militants in Kashmir and could even scale down its operations. He was awarded the Ati Vishisht Seva Medal (AVSM) for his services as the XV Corps Commander.

General Padmanabhan held the appointment of Director General Military Intelligence (DGMI) after the successful culmination of which, he took over as the General Officer Commanding-in-Chief Northern Command at Udhampur on 1 September 1996. Before being appointed as the Chief of Army Staff, he was the GOC-in-C of Southern Command.

He retired on 31 December 2002, after completing more than 43 years of distinguished military service. He has authored two books. He presently resides in Chennai.

Author
Gen. Padmanabhan is also an author of Indian military fiction, including the 2004 novel Writing on the Wall, the plot of which involves India fighting a war simultaneously with Pakistan while improving relations with China.

Honours and awards

Military awards

Dates of rank

References

|-

1940 births
Living people
Chiefs of Army Staff (India)
Indian generals
Rashtriya Indian Military College alumni
Military personnel from Thiruvananthapuram
Tamil people
National Defence College, India alumni
Recipients of the Param Vishisht Seva Medal
Recipients of the Ati Vishisht Seva Medal
Recipients of the Vishisht Seva Medal
Defence Services Staff College alumni